ZLW may refer to:

 Lage Zwaluwe railway station, Netherlands, station code
 Whitechapel station, London, station code